Johann Gonzales Chua is a Filipino professional pool player from Manila. His nickname is "Bad Koi".

Early life 
Born and raised in Bacolod in the central Philippines, Chua began playing pool at the age of nine. He was often accompanied to the local pool hall by his father who gave him the nickname "Bubwit" or little mouse due to the fact that he was too little to be seen behind the pool table. Chua quit schooling at 13 to pursue his passion and began playing professionally at the age of 19.

Career 

In October 2011, Johann Chua was ninth at the BSCP National Open Pool Championships Overall. In December, he finished 17th at the Manny Pacquiao International 10-ball championship held in General Santos. In November 2012 he achieved his first major international success with third place at the Japan Open. In 2013, he finished 17th at the China Open. He was third again at the Japan Open 2013.

In 2014, Chua managed to reach the final in the China Open. In the last 16 he lost against the Taiwanese Chang Jung-Lin. At the 2014 WPA World Nine-ball Championship that took place a few days later, he reached the final round of a world championship for the first time. In the quarter-finals, however, he parted with his countryman Elmer Haya. In September 2014 Chua was seventh in the Manny Pacquiao Cup.

At the 2015 WPA World Ten-ball Championship, he reached the quarter-finals after defeating Ralf Souquet, Wang Can and Lee Van Corteza, defeating David Alcaide at 9–11. At the 2015 WPA World Nine-ball Championship he lost to Yukio Akakariyama in the round of the last 64. In November 2015, Chua defeated pool superstars Ralf Souquet, Lo Li-wen, Shane Van Boening, and eventually fellow countryman Ronato Alcano 7–11 in the finals to clinch the All Japan Championship title, his first international title.

In 2017, Chua settled for bronze medal at the Southeast Asian Games held in Malaysia after falling behind Duong Quoc Hoang of Vietnam in the semifinals. In September of that year, Chua, with partner Warren Kiamco, brought home the bronze medal from the Asian Indoor and Martial Arts Games held in Ashgabat, Turkmenistan. Before that year ended, Chua snatched his second All Japan Championship title after defeating compatriot Jundel Mazon, 11–2. He is currently ranked 13th by the World Pool-Billiard Association.

Titles
 2022 Olongapo City 10-Ball Championship
 2022 Beasley Open 9-Ball
 2022 WPA World Mixed Teams 10-Ball Championship
 2022 Bayugan City 10-Ball Championship
 2021 Southeast Asian Games Nine-ball Singles
 2020 Manny Pacquiao 10-Ball Championship
 2018 Maryland 10-Ball Bar Table Championship
 2018 Philippines vs. Chinese Taipei Challenge Match
 2017 All Japan Championship 10-Ball
 2015 All Japan Championship 10-Ball
 2014 B52 10-Ball Championship
 2010 Manny Pacquiao 10-Ball Championship

References

Living people
1992 births
Filipino pool players
Sportspeople from Bacolod
Sportspeople from Manila
Southeast Asian Games bronze medalists for the Philippines
Southeast Asian Games medalists in cue sports
Competitors at the 2017 Southeast Asian Games
Competitors at the 2019 Southeast Asian Games
Competitors at the 2021 Southeast Asian Games
Southeast Asian Games gold medalists for the Philippines
Southeast Asian Games competitors for the Philippines
Southeast Asian Games silver medalists for the Philippines